Monika Grzebinoga (born 1 March 1985) is a road cyclist from Poland. She represented her nation at the 2006, 2007, 2008 and 2009 UCI Road World Championships.

References

External links
 profile at Procyclingstats.com

1985 births
Polish female cyclists
Living people
Place of birth missing (living people)